Cum primum may refer to:

 Cum primum, an apostolic constitution promulgated in 1566 by Pope Pius V.
 Cum Primum, an encyclical promulgated in 1759 by Pope Clement XIII.
 Cum primum, an encyclical promulgated in 1832 by Pope Gregory XVI.